Thomas Pauck Rogne (born 29 June 1990) is a Norwegian professional footballer who plays for Swedish club Helsingborgs IF as a centre-back. Rogne has also been capped for the Norway national team.

Club career

Stabæk
Rogne started his career with Norwegian club Stabæk. He missed the entire 2008 season after tearing the anterior cruciate ligament in his knee in a pre-season friendly against Russian side Krylia Sovetov in La Manga. He played for Stabæk in UEFA Champions League qualifying matches against Copenhagen and Valencia, and also represented the club in the Europa League.

Celtic
Rogne signed for Celtic on 20 January 2010, and joined on a three and a half-year contract. Rogne was given the number 25 shirt.

On 10 February 2010, Rogne made his Celtic debut coming on as a substitute for Glenn Loovens in a 2–0 home win against Hearts in the SPL. He made his first start for Celtic at home against Dundee United in a 1–0 victory on 20 February 2010, he played very well and impressed the coach Tony Mowbray. Rogne impressed against Rangers on 28 February 2010 but was taken off due to a hamstring injury. He returned two months later in an away game against Dundee United but once again had to leave the field early through injury.

Rogne made his first competitive start of the 2010–11 season for Celtic against St Johnstone in a 3–0 win. In the following game he was sent off for a professional foul against Aberdeen. Despite this, Celtic went on to win the game by a record-breaking 9–0 score. He scored his first goal for Celtic in a 1–1 draw against Kilmarnock in December 2010. Rogne won many plaudits for his performance as Celtic beat Rangers 2–0 at Ibrox in the 2011 New Year derby. He scored his second goal for Celtic against Aberdeen in their 4–1 League Cup semi-final win on 29 January 2011.  Rogne took part in his first major Cup Final on 20 March 2011 when Celtic played Rangers in the Scottish League Cup Final, but they lost 2–1.  An injury in May sidelined Rogne for the rest of the season.

Injury kept Rogne out of the Celtic side for the first few months of the following season.  He returned to the Celtic first team in October 2011 in their League Cup quarter-final tie against Hibernian. Rogne continued to struggle with a series of minor injuries, but nevertheless played well in the majority of his sporadic appearances, having kept a clean sheet in over half the games he played.   On 25 March 2012, he scored in Celtic's 3–2 defeat to Rangers at Ibrox.

Wigan Athletic
On 27 June 2013, it was confirmed that Rogne would leave Celtic after his contract expired to join FA Cup holders Wigan Athletic on a free transfer, signing a three-year contract.

On 31 August 2013, Rogne made his Wigan debut at home against Nottingham Forest in a 2–1 win for the side.

IFK Göteborg
On 14 March 2015, Rogne signed a three-year-long contract with Allsvenskan team IFK Göteborg.

Lech Poznań
On 1 August 2017, Rogne signed a four-year contract with Ekstraklasa side Lech Poznań, effective from 1 January 2018. He was the captain from January 2020 until July 2021.

On 19 December 2021, following Lech's 2–0 home win against Górnik Zabrze, it was announced his contract would not be extended and he would depart the club on 31 December 2021.

Apollon Smyrnis
On 4 January 2022, Greek side Apollon Smyrnis F.C., via his official website, informed about the acquisition of Thomas Rogne from Lech Poznań on a free transfer. The central defender, after passing the medical tests, signed a contract with the Greek club valid until 30 June 2023.

Helsingborg
On 1 July 2022, Rogne signed a contract with Helsingborgs IF in Sweden until the end of 2024.

International career
Rogne has represented Norway at youth level, and played for the under-19 team in the 2009 UEFA Under-19 Championship qualification. Rogne was later captain of the under-21 team, and were playing alongside the captain Stefan Strandberg in the central defence when Norway U21 qualified for the 2013 UEFA European Under-21 Championship.

In March 2011, he received his first call-up to the Norway senior side for their Euro 2012 qualification match with Denmark but did not feature.

Rogne made his senior debut for Norway on 29 February 2012 in a 3–0 friendly win against Northern Ireland.

Personal life
In May 2019, Rogne married female professional footballer Ada Hegerberg.

Career statistics

Club

International

Honours
Stabæk
Superfinalen: 2009

Celtic
Scottish Premier League: 2011–12, 2012–13
Scottish Cup: 2010–11, 2012–13

IFK Göteborg
Svenska Cupen: 2014–15

Lech Poznań
Ekstraklasa: 2021–22

References

External links

Profil: Thomas Rogne, 18  Stabæk

1990 births
Living people
Sportspeople from Bærum
Norwegian footballers
Norway youth international footballers
Norway under-21 international footballers
Norway international footballers
Association football defenders
Stabæk Fotball players
Celtic F.C. players
Wigan Athletic F.C. players
IFK Göteborg players
Lech Poznań players
Lech Poznań II players
Apollon Smyrnis F.C. players
Helsingborgs IF players
Eliteserien players
Scottish Premier League players
English Football League players
Allsvenskan players
Ekstraklasa players
II liga players
III liga players
Super League Greece players
Expatriate footballers in Scotland
Expatriate footballers in England
Expatriate footballers in Sweden
Expatriate footballers in Poland
Expatriate footballers in Greece
Norwegian expatriate footballers
Norwegian expatriate sportspeople in Scotland
Norwegian expatriate sportspeople in England
Norwegian expatriate sportspeople in Sweden
Norwegian expatriate sportspeople in Poland
Norwegian expatriate sportspeople in Greece